The Malagasy records in swimming are the fastest ever performances of swimmers from Madagascar, which are recognised and ratified by the Federation Malgache De Natation.

All records were set in finals unless noted otherwise.

Long Course (50 m)

Men

Women

Mixed relay

Short Course (25 m)

Men

Women

Mixed relay

References

Malagasy
Swimming
Records
Swimming